Helsingfors was a Finnish freight and passenger steamship built in Belgium in 1903 for Helsingfors Ångfartygs Aktiebolaget. She ran aground and sank near Bengtskär on 1 January 1905. The accident resulted in the construction of the Bengtskär Lighthouse.

Description 
Her triple expansion steam engine, made by North Eastern Marine Engineers Ltd, Sunderland, United Kingdom, was rated at 800 ihp.

History 
Helsingfors was built as yard number 24 by Chantiers Navals Anversois, Hoboken, Antwerp, Belgium. She was launched on 8 August 1903 and completed two months later.

She was on a voyage from Fowey, United Kingdom to Hanko with a cargo of kaolinite. The Finnish salvage vessel Protector also ran aground and was holed whilst going to her assistance. Two crew from Helsingfors, three from Protector and a pilot were drowned. These wrecks motivated the construction of the Bengtskär Lighthouse. The wreck was sold in 1906 for 401 Markka.

References 

1903 ships
Ships built in Belgium
Merchant ships of Finland
Passenger ships of Finland
Shipwrecks in the Baltic Sea
Maritime incidents in 1905
Maritime incidents in Finland